

This is a list of the National Register of Historic Places listings in Kent County, Rhode Island.

This is intended to be a complete list of the properties and districts on the National Register of Historic Places in Kent County, Rhode Island, United States. Latitude and longitude coordinates are provided for many National Register properties and districts; these locations may be seen together in a map.

There are 80 properties and districts listed on the National Register in the county, including 1 National Historic Landmark.

Current listings

|}

Former listings

|}

See also
 
 List of National Historic Landmarks in Rhode Island
 National Register of Historic Places listings in Rhode Island

References

 
Kent